was a Japanese actor and model.

Acting career 
Born , he was best known to tokusatsu fans as the android Ichiro in the Kikaider 01 series (1973–74). Ikeda's interest in acting came at an early age from his father, respected sword fight choreographer Tatsuo Ouchi.  He also had a black belt in judo and karate.  Ikeda studied with the Bunka-za Theater, first appearing on-screen in Hibari's Guitar of Motherly Love (1962).

Ikeda made only a handful of films, but found his niche on television, where he appeared in such shows as Special Mobile Investigation Unit (1963), Comrades (1963), Story of Coming Wind (1963), Aboard With 27 People (1964) and Onihei Hankacho (1969–70).

While Ikeda's biggest and best-known tokusatsu role was in Kikaider 01, and Takeshi Minami in Return of Ultraman, he also appeared in Operation: Mystery (1968–69), Silver Mask (1971–72), Himitsu Sentai Gorenger (1975–77), and Ultraman Mebius & Ultraman Brothers (2006).

Education 
Ikeda graduated from Hosei University in 1967 with a degree in economics.

Later years 
Ikeda was a fashion model for the SOS Modeling Agency, a commercial spokesman for Toshiba, and also appeared in several stage productions.

Popularity 
Ikeda developed a fan following in Hawaii as well as Japan.  In 2001, he and Kikaider star Daisuke Ban made a personal appearance in Hawaii, meeting with fans who grew up watching the Honolulu broadcasts of Kikaider and Kikaider 01.  This led to both series being revived on TV and released on DVD, as well as additional live appearances, special events, and autograph sessions in both Japan and Hawaii.

In a 2008 interview, Ikeda mentioned that he was upset that Kikaider's Hawaii popularity was not widely known in Japan.

Death 
Ikeda died on June 11, 2010 from complications of diabetes.

Filmography

References

External links
SOS Model Engine
Ultra series profile

1941 births
2010 deaths
Japanese male film actors
Japanese male television actors
Japanese male models
People from Kawasaki, Kanagawa
Deaths from diabetes
Male actors from Kanagawa Prefecture
20th-century Japanese male actors
21st-century Japanese male actors